Ota Hofman, alias Ota Dvorský (10 April 1928 in Prague — 17 May 1989 in Prague) was Czechoslovak writer of children's literature and young adult literature and a screenwriter.

One of his most famous characters is Pan Tau, co-authored with film director Jindřich Polák.

Awards
Golden Gong Award of the German Gong radio/TV listings magazine (together with Jindřich Polák) for The Visitors (Czechoslovak TV series).
1979: Meritorious Artist honorary title
1989: National Artist honorary title

References

External links

Ota Hofman in the German National Library catalog

1928 births
1989 deaths
Writers from Prague
Czech children's writers
Czechoslovak writers
Czech screenwriters
Male screenwriters
Czech-language writers
20th-century screenwriters